Royal Air Force Little Walden or more simply RAF Little Walden is a former Royal Air Force station primarily used by the United States Army Air Forces located north of Saffron Walden, Essex, England.

The following units were here at some point:
 56th Fighter Group (Republic P-47 Thunderbolt)
 61st Fighter Squadron
 62nd Fighter Squadron
 63rd Fighter Squadron
 97th Combat Bombardment Wing (Light)
 97th Combat Bombardment Wing (Medium)
 361st Fighter Group (P-47/North American P-51 Mustang)
 374th Fighter Squadron
 375th Fighter Squadron
 376th Fighter Squadron
 409th Bombardment Group (Ninth Air Force)
 493rd Bombardment Group (Heavy) (Boeing B-17 Flying Fortress)
 860th Bombardment Squadron
 861st Bombardment Squadron
 862d Bombardment Squadron
 863rd Bombardment Squadron

References

Royal Air Force stations in Essex